The Souler Opposite is a 1998 American romantic comedy-drama film written and directed by Bill Kalmenson and starring Christopher Meloni, Timothy Busfield and Janel Moloney.

Plot

Cast
Christopher Meloni as Barry Singer
Janel Moloney as Thea Douglas
Timothy Busfield as Robert Levin
John Putch as Lester
Allison Mackie as Diane
Rutanya Alda as Thea's Mom
Josh Keaton as Young Barry
Jed Rhein as Young Robert
Steve Landesberg as Himself
Robert Fields as Jay Smiley
Devon Meade as Sandra

References

External links
 
 

1998 romantic comedy-drama films
American romantic comedy-drama films
1998 comedy films
1998 drama films
1998 films
1990s English-language films
1990s American films